McLean County is the name of three counties in the United States:

 McLean County, Illinois 
 McLean County, Kentucky 
 McLean County, North Dakota